Saraghrar is the fourth highest independent peak in the Hindu Kush. Its distinct summits are poorly identified, and information gathered from expeditions that have visited the area is often misleading. The main summits are: NE summit, northwest summit, southwest summit, south summit and southeast summit.

Climbing history

In 1958 a British team led by Ted Norrish made a first try on the northeast summit. This expedition was stopped by the death of member P. S. Nelson.

The year after, on August 24, 1959, the northeast peak was climbed for the first time by an Italian team led by Fosco Maraini and including Franco Alletto, Giancarlo Castelli, Paolo Consiglio, Carlo Alberto "Betto" Pinelli (the latter four reaching the top), Silvio Jovane, Franco Lamberti (expedition's doctor) and Enrico Leone, all members of the Italian Alpine Club (Rome section). They ascended via the Niroghi glacier on the northeast of the massif.

On August 24, 1967, Satoh Yukitoshi and Hara Hirosada, members of a Japanese expedition led by Kenichiro Yamamoto (Mountaineering club of Hitotsubashi University) reached the South Summit for the first time by the Rosh-Gol glacier.

In 1971, Nagano, member of a Japanese expedition (Shizuoka climbing club) led by Akiyama Reiske, summitted the SW peak for the first time on July 29.

Three Catalan expeditions in 1975, 1977 and 1982 tried the Northwest summit (7,300 m (23,950ft)) via Southwest pillar from the Rosh Gol valley. On August 9, 1982, Juan Lopez Diaz (expedition leader), Enrique Lucas Llop and Nil Bohigas Martorell reached the northwest II summit.

In 2005, five members of a Swiss expedition led by Jean-Michel Zweiacker reached the southeast summit for the first time (Mazal Chevallier, Sébastien Grosjean and Yves-Alain Peter on July 24; Marc Bélanger and Jean-Michel Zweiacker on July 29).

In 2021, Georgian mountaineers Archil Badriashvili, Giorgi Tepnadze, and Bakar Gelashvili made the first ascent of Saraghrar Northwest on September 10th. The ascent was completed in alpine style over 8 days, via the unclimbed NW face from the Rosh Gol valley, and won them the 2022 Piolet d'Or.

See also
 List of highest mountains of the world
 List of mountains in Pakistan

References

3.https://agenda.ge/en/news/2021/2647

Sources 
 Paropamiso (by Fosco Maraini, 2003) (Mondadori, Milano, Italy) 
 Chitral Tour Guide Book (by Rahmat Karim Baig, 2004)
 Hindu Kush Study Series (2 Volumes) (by Rahmat Karim Baig, 1994/1997) (Rehmat Printing Press, Peshawar, Pakistan)

External links

 Terichmir, Highest Peak in Hindukush

Mountains of Khyber Pakhtunkhwa
Mountains of Pakistan
Mountains of the Hindu Kush
Seven-thousanders of the Hindu Kush